The Foundation for Broadcast Culture is the only institution dedicated to the promotion of broadcasting in South Korea. Partly to address concerns following the country's 1987 democratic reforms, the National Assembly established the Foundation for Broadcast Culture to insulate MBC from political influence and KBS. The foundation was established as a not-for-profit statutory corporation in accordance with "The Foundation for Broadcast Culture" Act (Ordinance No. 6137) first formulated on December 26, 1988. 
  	
It is a major shareholder of MBC (Munhwa Broadcasting Corporation) to which 70% of the stocks of MBC was donated as "the initial fund for the promotion of broadcasting culture" from the government. Except for the corporate structure, the concept of the foundation is similar to Channel 4 Television Corporation in the United Kingdom (formerly a subsidiary of the British IBA).

References

Munhwa Broadcasting Corporation
Government agencies of South Korea
Non-profit organizations based in South Korea
Organizations established in 1988
Foundations based in South Korea